Vyacheslav Sergeyevich Karavayev (born 20 May 1995) is a Russian professional footballer who plays as a right back for Russian Premier League club Zenit St. Petersburg and the Russia national team.

Club career
Karavayev made his debut in the Russian Premier League for CSKA Moscow on 2 December 2013 in a game against FC Rostov.

Karavayev joined Dukla Prague of the Czech First League on a season-long loan deal during the summer of 2014.

On 16 August 2016, he returned to the Czech Republic, signing on the permanent basis with AC Sparta Prague.

On 31 January 2018, he signed a 3.5-year contract with Eredivisie club Vitesse who paid €2.5 million for him.

On 2 September 2019, he signed a 4-year contract with the Russian Premier League champion Zenit St. Petersburg.

International
On 11 March 2019, he was called up to the Russia national football team for the Euro 2020 qualifiers against Belgium on 21 March 2019 and Kazakhstan on 24 March 2019. He made his debut on 13 October 2019 in a Euro 2020 qualifier against Cyprus. He substituted Sergei Petrov in the 38th minute due to injury to Petrov.

On 3 September 2020 he scored his first goal for Russia national team against Serbia in 2020–21 UEFA Nations League B.

On 11 May 2021, he was included in the preliminary extended 30-man squad for UEFA Euro 2020. On 2 June 2021, he was included in the final squad. In Russia's opening game against Belgium on 12 June 2021, he substituted injured Yuri Zhirkov late in the first half, as Russia lost 0–3. In the second game against Finland on 16 June, he once again had to come on as a first-half substitute for an injured teammate, this time Mário Fernandes, Russia won the game 1–0. He appeared as a second-half substitute on 21 June in the last group game against Denmark as Russia lost 1–4 and was eliminated.

Career statistics

Club

International

International goals

Scores and results list Russia's goal tally first.

Honours

Club
CSKA Moscow
Russian Premier League: 2013–14

Zenit Saint Petersburg
Russian Premier League: 2019–20, 2020–21, 2021–22
Russian Cup: 2019–20
Russian Super Cup: 2020, 2021

References

External links
 
 
 

1995 births
Living people
Russian footballers
Association football defenders
Russian Premier League players
PFC CSKA Moscow players
Czech First League players
FK Dukla Prague players
FK Jablonec players
AC Sparta Prague players
SBV Vitesse players
FC Zenit Saint Petersburg players
Eredivisie players
Russia youth international footballers
Russia under-21 international footballers
Russia international footballers
UEFA Euro 2020 players
Russian expatriate footballers
Expatriate footballers in the Czech Republic
Expatriate footballers in the Netherlands
Russian expatriate sportspeople in the Czech Republic
Russian expatriate sportspeople in the Netherlands